Bulbophyllum pecten-veneris, the yellow-flowered bulbophyllum or golden comb orchid, is a species of orchid.

References

pecten-veneris